Sandro Miguel Sison Reyes (born March 29, 2003) is a Filipino professional footballer who plays as a midfielder for Regionalliga Bayern club Greuther Fürth II and the Philippines national team.

Personal life
Reyes comes from a political family in the Philippines; his father, Edmundo Reyes Jr., served as the representative for the province of Marinduque's at-large congressional district from 1998 to 2007 and is a former executive director of the Toll Regulatory Board; his paternal grandmother, Carmencita Reyes, had also served as Marinduque congresswoman from 1978 to 1998 and from 2007 until her election as governor of Marinduque in 2010, which she served until her death in 2019; and his aunt, Regina Reyes Mandanas, was Marinduque's congresswoman from 2013 to 2016 as well as the wife of the governor of Batangas province from 1995 to 2004 and from 2016 until her death in 2022.

Club career

Youth
At the age of 9, Reyes joined FCB Escola, a youth academy, of Spanish La Liga side Barcelona. After that, he joined the youth academy of Santboià in the Spanish fifth division.

Azkals Development Team
In 2021, he joined Filipino club ADT. Reyes made his debut for ADT in a 2–0 defeat against Kaya–Iloilo in 2021 Copa Paulino Alcantara. He scored his first goal for ADT in a 9–0 win against Mendiola 1991, scoring the last goal of the match.

Kaya–Iloilo
In January 2022, Reyes joined Philippines Football League club Kaya–Iloilo.

Greuther Fürth II
In January 2023, Reyes moved to Germany to join SpVgg Greuther Fürth II of the Regionalliga.

International career

Philippines U16
In 2018, Reyes received a call up from Philippines U16 for the 2018 AFF U-16 Youth Championship. He made his debut in a 8–0 defeat to hosts Indonesia U16. Reyes scored his only goal for Philippines U16 in a 1–6 defeat against Vietnam U16.

Philippines U19
In July 2022, Reyes was called up to represent the Philippines U19 for the 2022 AFF U-19 Youth Championship in Indonesia. He made his debut for Philippines U19 in a 1-0 defeat against Thailand U19.

Philippines U23
In October 2021, Reyes received a call up from Philippines U23 for the 2022 AFC U-23 Asian Cup qualification matches against South Korea U23, Singapore U23 and Timor Leste U23. He made his debut for Philippines U23 in a 3-0 defeat against South Korea U23. Reyes scored his first goal for Philippines U23 in a 2–1 win against Brunei U23.

Reyes was included in the 20-man squad for 31st Southeast Asian Games, which was held in Vietnam.

Philippines
Reyes received his first call up from the Philippines national team for the 2020 AFF Championship. He made his senior international debut in a 2–3 win against Myanmar coming in as a substitute, replacing Oskari Kekkonen at the 72nd minute.

International goals
Scores and results list the Philippines' goal tally first.

References

External links
 

Expatriate footballers in Spain
Living people
Philippines international footballers
Filipino expatriate footballers
Filipino expatriate sportspeople in Spain
Association football midfielders
Azkals Development Team players
Filipino footballers
2003 births
Competitors at the 2021 Southeast Asian Games
Southeast Asian Games competitors for the Philippines